is a Japanese voice actress affiliated with Aoni Production. She mainly voices young girls and young boys. She is known for voicing Miles "Tails" Prower in the Sonic the Hedgehog series.

Biography
Hirohashi was born in Niigata Prefecture, her family's home being a Buddhist temple. Due to family reasons, she attended Ryukoku University in Kyoto, a Buddhist university, but in the middle of her first year, she was told by her parents that she could do what she liked even if it wasn't related to Buddhism, so she sought out what she wanted to do. During her second year, she remembered a radio show she used to listen to in junior high school and became interested in voice acting, so she attended the Aoni Coaching School Osaka while attending university at the same time. The radio personality she had listened to in junior high school was a voice actor, so upon learning that such a job exists, she decided to become a voice actor herself.

She graduated from the 16th class of Aoni Coaching School Osaka and made her debut as a voice actor in Aquarian Age: Sign for Evolution in 2002. In February 2007, her profile was posted on the list of graduates page on the official website of Aoni Coaching School Osaka.

Filmography

Anime

Unknown Date 
Ar tonelico Qoga: Knell of Ar Ciel – Katene
Fragile: Sayonara Tsuki no Haikyo – Sai
Koumajou Densetsu II: Stranger's Requiem – Youmu Konpaku
Otomedius – Tita Nium
Pokémon: Twilight Wings - Allister
Rune Factory Oceans – Merupurin
WarTech: Senko No Ronde – Ernula
Wrestle Angels: Survivor – Succubus Manabe
Zettai Zetsumei Toshi 3 – Rina Makimura
The Legend of Nayuta: Boundless Trails – LyraHyperdimension Neptunia U – DengekikoGranblue Fantasy'' – Sen

Films

Video games

References

External links
  
 

1977 births
Living people
Aoni Production voice actors
Japanese video game actresses
Japanese voice actresses
Voice actresses from Niigata Prefecture
20th-century Japanese actresses
21st-century Japanese actresses